Pelican Point may refer to:

Australia

South Australia
 Pelican Point, Adelaide, a headland 
 Pelican Point Power Station, a power station 
 Pelican Point, South Australia, a locality

Western Australia
 Pelican Point, Western Australia, a suburb of Bunbury
 Pelican Point (Swan River)
 Pelican Point (Houtman Abrolhos), on West Wallabi Island

Canada
Pelican Point, Alberta, a hamlet in Alberta, Canada

United States
 Pelican Point (Utah), a location on the shore of Utah Lake, Utah County, Utah

See also
Pelican (disambiguation)
Pelican Island (disambiguation)
Pelican Lake (disambiguation)